The Rembrandt House Museum is a museum located in a former house in the Jodenbreestraat, in the center of Amsterdam. Between 1639 and 1658, the house was occupied by the well-known Dutch painter Rembrandt van Rijn, who also had his studio and art dealership there.

The house was built around 1606 and was renovated around 1627, probably under the supervision of Jacob van Campen. It was then given an extra floor and a new facade with a triangular pediment. Rembrandt bought it on January 5, 1639 for thirteen thousand guilders. After his bankruptcy it was auctioned in 1658 and sold for eleven thousand guilders. In the following centuries it was used as a residence and was renovated several times.

At the beginning of the 20th century, the building was in poor condition, and on the occasion of the Rembrandt Year in 1906, it was purchased in 1907 by the municipality of Amsterdam, which donated it to the Rembrandthuis foundation. Between 1907 and 1911 the house was restored by Karel de Bazel. The museum was opened on June 10, 1911. Queen Wilhelmina and Prince Hendrik were the first visitors. The Rembrandt House Museum owes its foundation to an initiative by the painter Jozef Israëls.

Since 2008, the museum had around 200,000 visitors per year, with a record number of over 280.000 visitors in 2019.

Rembrandt's house 
The current museum shows Rembrandt's living and working quarters, including his living room, art room and the studio where he created his masterpieces. The building was redesigned in the 20th century on the basis of the inventory that was drawn up during Rembrandt's bankruptcy in 1656. This gives the visitor an idea of Rembrandt's daily life, his studio practice and what a private house and artist's studio looked like in the 17th century. In Rembrandt's old house there are also works of art from the 17th century, including by Rembrandt's teacher Pieter Lastman and his pupils Ferdinand Bol and Govert Flinck.

Collection 
The Rembrandt House Museum owns an almost complete collection of etchings by Rembrandt. These are regularly displayed in the etching cabinet and in temporary exhibitions in the modern museum wing.

In 2019, material-technical research showed that two pots ('grapes') found in 1997 in Rembrandt's cesspool were in fact used by the artist. One of the pots contains remnants of quartz soil. This is a mixture of quartz and clay with which Rembrandt prepared his canvases before painting. Leonore van Sloten, curator of Museum Het Rembrandthuis, said about this in the newspaper Het Parool: “Rembrandt started using so-called quartz soil from the moment he lived in what is now the museum, and as far as we know is the only one who this did. A mixture of quartz and clay was probably convenient for him from a practical and financial point of view.” The two pots are on display in the museum.

In 2021, The Rembrandt House Museum received a painting from Mr. and Mrs. Hoogsteder to support the museum during the Covid crisis. The new acquisition is the painting Shepherdess in a Landscape from ca. 1641, made by Ferdinand Bol, one of Rembrandt's most famous pupils. The painting hangs in Rembrandt's former living room and bedroom.

In 2022, the museum purchased four contemporary works of art by Natasja Kensmil and Milan Gies. The museum also owns contemporary art by (amongst others) Marlene Dumas, Reinder Homan, Iriée Zamblé and Timothy Voges.

Exhibitions 

The modern museum wing hosts temporary exhibitions throughout the year with works of art by Rembrandt, his contemporaries and his (contemporary) followers. During the national Rembrandt Year in 2019, The Rembrandt House Museum showed three exhibitions: Rembrandt's Social Network, Inspired by Rembrandt and Laboratory Rembrandt. Other high-profile exhibits were Peter Vos: Metamorphosis (2016), Rembrandt's Naked Truth (2016), Glenn Brown (2017), Govert Flinck and Ferdinand Bol (2017-2018), HERE. Black in Rembrandt's time (2020), Hansken, Rembrandt's Elephant (2021) and RAW (2022).

See also
 List of single-artist museums

References

External links 

 Rembrandt House Museum, official website

1911 establishments in the Netherlands
Art museums and galleries in the Netherlands
Art museums established in 1911
Biographical museums in the Netherlands
Historic house museums in the Netherlands
Houses completed in 1607
Museums devoted to one artist
Museums in Amsterdam
Rembrandt
Rijksmonuments in Amsterdam
20th-century architecture in the Netherlands